Bolærne is an archipelago in the outer part of Oslofjord, in the municipality Nøtterøy in Vestfold, Norway. The islands have a total land area of 2.6 km². The largest island, Mellom Bolæren, covers 1.1 km². The easternmost island is Østre Bolæren. The islands have been inhabited by fishermen from the 16th century. There was a coastal fortress from 1916 to 2002. The archipelago is included in the Færder National Park, which was established in 2013.

References

Islands of Vestfold og Telemark